The Lalla Aïcha Challenge Tour is a golf tournament on the Challenge Tour. It was first played in October 2019 at Royal Golf Dar Es Salam, Rabat, Morocco. It was the first Challenge Tour event to be played in Morocco since the 2010 Moroccan Golf Classic The inaugural event was won by Oliver Farr. Farr started the final day 4 strokes behind the leaders but had a final round 63 to win by 3 shots.

Winners

References

External links
Coverage on the Challenge Tour's official site

Former Challenge Tour events
Golf tournaments in Morocco
2019 establishments in Africa
Recurring sporting events established in 2019